Księga Urodzaju – third album in Marcin Rozynek's music career and artist's solo debut. It was released on 12 May 2003.

Track listing 
"Do fabryk wrócić czas" - 4:02 (It's time to go back to factories)
"Siłacz" - 3:59 (Strong man)
"Spojrzałeś mi prosto w twarz" - 3:29 (You looked me in the face)
"Ślepy los" - 3:25 (Blind chance)
"Pół-ludzie, pół-bogowie" - 3:55 (Half men, half gods)
"Wstrząsająca historia do której scenariusz napisało życie" - 5:53 (A shocking story, with screenplay written by life)
"Najlepsze" - 4:25 (To the best one)
"Księga urodzaju" - 4:18 (The book of harvest)
"Poławiacze ogni" - 3:43 (Fire catchers)
"Tobą żywię się" - 4:00 (I'm feeding you)
"Nieżywiec (bonus)" - 4:29 (Dead one)

Singles 
Najlepsze (2003)
Siłacz (2003)
Ślepy los (2003)

External links
 Label's note about the album

2003 debut albums
Marcin Rozynek albums